Edward Akika (born 18 July 1941) is a retired Olympic track and field athlete from Nigeria. He specialised in the hurdling and the long jump events during his career.

Akika represented Nigeria at the 1964 Olympic Games. He claimed the gold medal for his native West African country in the men's long jump event at the 1965 All-Africa Games.

External links
 sports-reference

1941 births
Living people
Nigerian male hurdlers
Nigerian male long jumpers
Olympic athletes of Nigeria
Athletes (track and field) at the 1964 Summer Olympics
African Games gold medalists for Nigeria
African Games medalists in athletics (track and field)
Athletes (track and field) at the 1965 All-Africa Games